The Nigerian Medical Students' Association (NiMSA) is the official umbrella organization of all medical students studying in recognized medical schools in Nigeria, irrespective of their nationalities. It is the official student arm of the Nigerian Medical Association (NMA) (Act Cap 221 Laws of the Federation of Nigeria).

History 

In 1968, a group of students founded NiMSA to represent Nigerian medical students in Nigeria and the diaspora, bringing the Nigerian medical students together as one body to discuss ideas, share information, and voice  opinions and concerns. Since then, the Nigerian Medical Students Association has grown and evolved into a large student-representative body. NiMSA attained full membership status of the International Federation of Medical Students' Associations (IFMSA) in 1970, creating an environment for research collaboration and opportunity for recognition and Internship at WHO, WMA, WFPHA, UNESCO, UNFPA, UN, and the likes along with 1.3 million medical students in over 100 countries worldwide.

Past President 
The Association has these past presidents to date.

Member Schools

About NiMSA 

The purpose of creating NiMSA was to integrate Medical students across medical colleges in Nigeria and to allow its members to take their vision and making them a reality.

NiMSA allows its Members to create an impact on the local level on many global health topics through carrying out activities.

Organizational structure 
For the over 45 member medical student associations to work together, NiMSA has created an organizational structure that facilitates the completion goals and coordination of all activities. The main pillars of NiMSA international structure are as follows:

 The Executive Council

The Executive Council is responsible for the daily running of the association and deals with issues such as publicity, internal and external relations, administration, finances, fundraising, partnerships, correspondence e.t.c.

 The President,
 The Vice President of Internal Affairs, and External Affairs,
 The Presidents of registered member Medical Student Associations,
 The Secretary-General,
 The Treasurer,
 The Public Relations Officer,
 The Directors of Standing Committees,
 The Immediate Past President,
 Other officers appointed by the President.

 The Standing Committees

NiMSA creates an impact at the grassroots through active medical students, and it works on activities, projects, and campaigns that align with the international strategy set at the General Assembly, a

ait all manifeot through sn specifteamslds called Standing Committees.

The Standing Committees; The Standing Committees are nine in number, each focusing on topics that are of high value to  the Nigerian Medical Students, and they include;

 Standing Committee on Public Health (SCOPH),
 Standing Committee on Sexual and Reproductive Health and Rights including HIV and AIDS (SCORA),
 Standing Committee on Medical Education (SCOME)
 Standing Committee on Human Rights & Peace (SCORP),
 Standing Committee on Professional Exchange (SCOPE),
 Standing Committee on Research Exchange (SCORE),
 Standing Committee on Environmental and Population Activities (SCOEPA)
 Standing Committee on Capacity Building (SCOCB),
 Standing Committee on Policy Implementation (SCOPI).

 Standing Committees governed by Directors, selected by the NiMSA President, who is supported by a team generally consisting of one Local Liaison Officer from every Medical Student Association {MSA}. They are in charge of the standing committee's sessions at their MSAs and contribute to general tasks on the development of their standing committees.

 The General Assembly

The General Assembly is the highest authority and policy-making body of NiMSA, where members decide on the annual priorities, elect the national officials and vote on organizational issues. The General Assembly convenes annually in the 1st week of November at the medical school with the hosting rights, and composes of delegates/representatives (maximum of 10) of all registered member medical student associations.

The General Assembly scrutinizes and criticizes the activities of the Standing Committees, and the Presidency. The General Assembly also elects the members of the Executive Council and Officers Council every year during the General Assembly.

 Regional Directorates

NiMSA comprises six regions - North West, South West, North East, South East, North Central, and South-South. 

Each region led by a Regional Coordinator, appointed by the National President, foster the outreach of the association and increase collaboration among the MSAs, and at the same time promotes the representation of members and the diversity of cultures within NiMSA.

Tenure 
The NiMSA year(tenure) starts from January 1 until December 31. The Executive Council and Officers Council elected during the General Assembly resumes office on January 1 of the next year. The time interval between the General Assembly and January 1 of the new year is the transition period.

Activities

NiMSA Games 
NiMSA organizes once-in-two-years NiMSA games and has had 17 editions of the NiMSA games up until 2018. In the last edition, took place in 2018, the University of Ilorin Medical Students' Association( ILUMSA) hosted the Games and came out on top garnered 41 medals comprising 16 gold, 15 silver, and 10bronze

Campaigns and outreach 

 Preventing Maternal Mortality, a conference which was the last for the then-president Mr. Auwal Shanono, who was one of the unlucky victims that died during the violence by members of the National Union of Road Transport Workers in Ibadan.
 Climate Change: A global menace that can be halted locally.
 Medicine And Politics: Mentoring Medical Students For Leadership.
 Medical Students For Literary Awards.
 Orangetheworld campaign.
 World Oral day
 Starting early: Medical students, sexual/reproductive health and secondary school girls.

References 

1968 establishments in Nigeria
Organizations based in Abuja
Students' unions in Nigeria